Grike, may refer to:

Grike, the character Shrike (Philip Reeve) in the North American editions of Hungry City Chronicles
Grike (Lake District) – a hill in the English Lake District
Grike or gryke, a feature of Limestone pavements